The 8mm/92 [8 x 27 mm R], officially designated as 8 mm Lebel by the  C.I.P.,  is a rimmed cartridge used in the 8mm M1892 revolver and inexpensive handguns manufactured in Belgium and Spain.  These are usually copies of the Modèle d'Ordonnance revolver itself or of then reputable foreign firearms (Colt Police Positive, Nagant M1895, Rast & Gasser M1898 or S&W Model 10).

Its dimensions are close to those of the 8mm Gasser.  Its bullet is cylindro-ogival and is of the jacketed type.  Its power is comparable to that of the original 7.65mm Browning (.32 ACP). Bullets are either .330 caliber [8.38mm] for cast lead bullets or .329 caliber [8.35mm] for full-metal-jacketed bullets. It may be reloaded with resized .32-20 cases.

Synonyms
 8 mm Lebel (Official  C.I.P. designation)
 [8,3 x 27,5 mm R Lebel] 
 8 mm Lebel Revolver M92
 8 mm Revolver réglementaire français M.1892 (Revolver réglementaire français > "Standard French Revolver")
 8 mm French Revolver M1892
 8 mm Revolver M.1892

References

Pistol and rifle cartridges